The 2015 Rafael Nadal tennis season officially began on 5 January 2015 with the start of the 2015 Qatar Open.

Year in detail

Australian Open Series

Qatar Open
Nadal began the year as the defending champion at the Qatar Open. However, he lost in the first round, suffering a shocking three set defeat to world number 127 Michael Berrer. He won the doubles title with Juan Mónaco.

Australian Open
Nadal opened his 2015 Australian Open by defeating Mikhail Youzhny in straight sets. In the second round, he prevailed in a tough five-setter against American Tim Smyczek, despite being visibly unwell at times during the match. He then beat Dudi Sela and Kevin Anderson in straight sets to advance to his 28th career Grand Slam quarterfinal. He was defeated there by Tomáš Berdych, thus ending his 17-match win streak against the Czech. This resulted in Berdych becoming only the second player to defeat all four members of the Big Four at a Grand Slam, after Jo-Wilfried Tsonga.

South American clay court season

Rio Open
Nadal reached the semifinals of the Rio Open after defeating Thomaz Bellucci, Pablo Carreño Busta and Pablo Cuevas. However, he lost to Fabio Fognini in three sets in the semifinals, despite winning the first set and being a break up in the second. This was the first loss in his career against the Italian.

Argentina Open
Nadal played in the ATP Buenos Aires tournament, in Argentina, reaching the final without losing a set. He won his first singles title of 2015 and his 46th career clay-court title with a straight-sets victory over Juan Mónaco.

The March Masters

Indian Wells Masters
Nadal reached the quarterfinals of the Indian Wells Masters after beating his first three opponents in straight sets. However, his run was ended by Milos Raonic who beat him in three tight sets after Nadal squandered three match points in the second set tiebreak.

Miami Open
He next competed at the Miami Open, hoping to reach the final for the fifth time and win the tournament for the first time. He had a bye in the first round and proceeded by beating Nicolás Almagro in straight sets but he lost to Fernando Verdasco in the next round in three sets, failing to reach the fourth round of the Miami Open for the first time since 2006 (absent in 2013).

European clay court season

Monte-Carlo Masters
Nadal began his favourite part of the season in the clay courts of Monte-Carlo. After a first round bye, he defeated Lucas Pouille in a straight sets match before working hard to pass through big-serving John Isner in three tough sets to book his quarterfinal spot. He defeated David Ferrer in another tight, three set match to proceed to the semifinals, and record his first win over a top 10 player since the final of the 2014 French Open. However, he was defeated by world No.1 Novak Djokovic in the semifinals in straight sets.

Barcelona Open
Nadal received a bye in the first round of the 2015 Barcelona Open Banc Sabadell and faced Nicolás Almagro in the second round, completing his revenge for his only loss in Barcelona last year to him by beating him in straight sets. However, he was upset by Fabio Fognini in the next round in straight sets for the second time in the year. The loss made Fognini become the fifth man to beat Nadal on clay more than once after Gastón Gaudio, Roger Federer, Novak Djokovic, and David Ferrer. He also became the second man to beat Nadal on clay twice in a row in the same year after Djokovic in 2011.

Madrid Open
After a first round bye, Nadal had wins over Steve Johnson and Simone Bolelli, each in two sets. He faced Grigor Dimitrov in the quarterfinals and also dispatched him in straight sets.  In the semifinals, Nadal had a two set win over Tomáš Berdych to reach his seventh Madrid Open final and 41st Masters 1000 final. He lost to Andy Murray in the final in straight sets. The loss saw Nadal drop out of the Top 5 for the first time since 2005, falling to No. 7.

Italian Open
Nadal was granted a first round bye and faced qualifier Marsel İlhan, dominating him in straight sets. He next faced the big-serving John Isner again in the third round and defeated him in straight sets to advance to the quarterfinals. He was taken down by Stan Wawrinka in the quarterfinals in straight sets, squandering a 6–2 lead in the first set tiebreak and four set points, marking the first time since 2008 that he did not reach the final at the tournament. This also marked the first time since 2004 that Nadal failed to win a single European clay court title before the French Open.

French Open
Nadal opened his campaign for a 10th French Open title by facing off against wildcard Quentin Halys, beating him in straight sets. He then defeated compatriot Nicolás Almagro and Andrey Kuznetsov, again both in straight sets. In the fourth round he defeated Jack Sock in four sets, but eventually lost to Novak Djokovic in the quarterfinals. The loss ended Nadal's 5 year winning streak at Roland Garros and was just his second loss ever at the tournament. This loss also marked the first time since 2004 that Nadal failed to win at least one of the first two Grand Slam events of the season. As a result, his ranking dropped to No. 10 in the ATP singles ranking, his lowest ranking since April 2005.

The grass season

Stuttgart Open
Nadal opened his  grass-court season campaign by participating in the Stuttgart Open and survived his first match against Marcos Baghdatis by beating him in three tight sets. He next faces Bernard Tomic and booked his semifinal spot by beating him in another three tight sets. Nadal reached his first grass-court tournament final since reaching the 2011 Wimbledon final by beating Gaël Monfils in straight sets. Nadal won his third Stuttgart title and first grass-court title for the first time since winning the 2010 Wimbledon Championships by beating Viktor Troicki in straight sets in the final. It was only his 2nd title of 2015.

Queen's Club Championships
Nadal played at the Queen's Club for the first time since 2011 as the fifth seed. He was knocked out in the first round by Alexandr Dolgopolov, who had previously beaten him at the 2014 BNP Paribas Open.

Wimbledon
Nadal played at the 2015 Wimbledon as tenth seed. After beating Thomaz Bellucci in the first round in straight sets, he was eliminated in the second round in four sets by Dustin Brown. By winning, Brown became the first ever qualifier to ever beat Nadal at a Grand Slam.

US Open Series

German Open

Nadal decided to participate in the German Open for the first time since he defeated Roger Federer in the 2008 final in this tournament. He faced a tough opponent, Fernando Verdasco, in the first round but managed to defeat him in three sets. He next faced Jiří Veselý and easily dispatched him in straight sets followed by another straightforward quarterfinal victory against Pablo Cuevas to set a semifinal encounter with Andreas Seppi, which he won again in straight sets. Nadal extended his streak of winning at least one European clay-court title every year since winning in 2004 by beating Fabio Fognini in the Hamburg final in straight sets.

Canadian Open

Nadal opened his hard-court season campaign in Canada where he had won the title 3 times. He faced Sergiy Stakhovsky as his first opponent and defeated him in straight sets. He beat Mikhail Youzhny in the third round and advanced to QF, where he  lost to Kei Nishikori in straight sets. This marked the first time in eight meetings that he lost a match against the Japanese player.

Cincinnati Masters

Nadal participated in the Cincinnati Masters the following week, hoping to repeat his 2013 feat by winning this tournament. He opened his campaign against Frenchman Jérémy Chardy and successfully defeated the Rogers Cup semi-finalist in straight sets to book his third round clash with compatriot Feliciano López, which he lost in three sets.

US Open

In the final major of the season, Nadal once again faced Fognini, and again was defeated by the player from Italy, losing in the third round. In that match, Nadal won the first two sets, and previously had been 151–0 in Grand Slam matches that he led two sets to love(0). However, Fognini still defeated Nadal in five sets. The upset loss ended Nadal's record 10-year streak of winning at least one major, and leaving him one year short of the record 11-year streak of reaching at least one major final (shared by Lendl and Sampras). This remained the only time he had lost a Grand Slam tournament singles match after starting with a 2-0 lead until the quarterfinals of the 2021 Australian Open where he lost to Stefanos Tsitsipas.

Asian Fall & Indoor Hard Court Season

Davis Cup

Nadal and many of his Spanish compatriots made a comeback to the Spanish Davis Cup team after the captain of the Spanish Davis Cup team, Gala Leon, was fired due to several critics and rebellions from the Spanish tennis players like Nadal and Ferrer. Spain was now at the Europe Africa Zone due to several consecutive losses. Spain meets Denmark in the 1st round play-offs and easily defeated Denmark with a dominant 5–0 score with Rafa winning in both doubles and singles. He won against Mikael Torpegaard in straight sets.

China Open

Nadal started the Asian Fall by participating in the China Open where he managed to reach the quarterfinals after beating home hope Wu Di and Vasek Pospisil both in straight sets. He survived a quarterfinal test against Jack Sock after comebacking from a set down to set a fifth meeting this year with his nemesis Fabio Fognini. He succeeded in exacting revenge against Fognini by beating him in straight sets to reach his first hard-court tournament final for more than a year. Nadal lost to World No.1 Novak Djokovic in the final 2-6, 2-6.

Shanghai Masters

Nadal received a first round bye into this ATP Masters 1000 event and faced Ivo Karlović in the second round.  Nadal won the first set 7-5 after initially trailing 3-5 but Karlovic forced the second set to a decider which he won 6-7(4).  After 2 hours and 44 minutes, Nadal prevailed in the third and final set decider 7-6(4) and won the match. Nadal then avenged his Indian Wells quarterfinals lost against Milos Raonic by beating him in straight sets to reach the quarterfinals. He defeated World No.4 and 2015 French Open Champion Stan Wawrinka in straight sets to reach his first semifinal of a Masters 1000 hard-court tournament in more than a year and with this win, Nadal qualified for the ATP World Tour Finals. Despite sporting an 8-3 head-to-head winning record against Jo-Wilfried Tsonga,  Nadal fell to the Frenchman in the semi-finals in three sets 4–6, 6–0, 5–7.

Swiss Indoors

Nadal participated in the Swiss Indoors ATP 500 at Basel and survived a scare in the first round against Lukáš Rosol by beating him in a comeback three-setter where Rosol was 2 points away from winning at the 2nd set at 5-4 on his own serve. In Nadal's next match against Grigor Dimitrov, Rafa battled back from a break down in the final set to defeat Dimitrov 6-4, 4-6, 6-3 to reach the Swiss Indoors quarter-finals. Nadal came back from a set and a break down to surpass big-serving Croatian Marin Čilić in three sets. Nadal reached the second final in a hard-court tournament of the season when he beat Frenchman Richard Gasquet in straight sets to set his first meeting for almost 2 years with long-time rival Roger Federer. However, in his first final at the Swiss Indoor, Nadal lost 3-6, 7-5, 3-6 to Federer.

Paris Masters

Nadal, seeded 7th, received a bye into the Round of 32 of the Paris Masters in Paris, France.  Rafa rolled into the Round of 16 with a 6-2, 6-2 win, his 2nd in back-to-back weeks, over Lukáš Rosol, the 66th-ranked Czech, in just over an hour. Nadal then took on the big hitting South African Kevin Anderson and made another comeback from a set down and 5-6 down in the second set tie-break, saving a match point and closing out the match by breaking twice in the third set. Nadal faced world No.4 Stan Wawrinka in the quarterfinals and despite pushing both sets to a tiebreaker, Rafa lost the match 6–7(8–10), 6–7(7–9).

ATP World Tour Finals

Rafael Nadal was seeded fifth in the 2015 ATP World Tour Finals in London and was drawn in the Ilie Năstase Group alongside Andy Murray, David Ferrer and Stan Wawrinka. He first played against Wawrinka and successfully crushed his nemesis in straight sets. Nadal continued his blistering resurgence of form by dominating a fellow Big Four, Murray, in straight sets to claim a semifinal spot in the ATP Finals. He then beat Ferrer in three sets, advancing to the semifinals with three wins. But he then lost to Novak Djokovic in straight sets.

All matches

Singles matches

Doubles matches

Tournament schedule

Singles schedule
Nadal's 2015 singles tournament schedule is as follows:
(Bolded letter indicates better or same result at the tournament)

1 The symbol (i) = indoors means that the respective tournament will be held indoors.

2 The ATP numbers between brackets = non-countable tournaments.

Yearly records

Head-to-head matchups
Rafael Nadal has a  match win–loss record in the 2015 season. The following list is ordered by number of wins:
(Bolded number marks a top 10 player at the time of match, Italic means top 30)

Finals

Singles: 6 (3–3)

Doubles: 1 (1–0)

Earnings

Bold font denotes tournament win

See also
 2015 ATP World Tour
 2015 Novak Djokovic tennis season
 2015 Roger Federer tennis season
 2015 Andy Murray tennis season
 2015 Stan Wawrinka tennis season

References

External links 
 
ATP tour profile

2015 Rafael Nadal tennis season
Nadal
Nadal tennis season